James Wooley or 'Woolley may refer to:

 Jimmy Wooley (born March 8, 1949), American judoka.
 James Woolley, keyboard player for the group Nine Inch Nails